James Henry White (March 1872 – 1944) was a Canadian film pioneer, who worked as a director, producer, and cinematographer. He also appeared as an actor in several films. He was employed by the Edison Manufacturing Company, and directed over 500 short films, both fictional and documentary. With no functional story or script, just scenes, White tried to be lyrical in some of his short films i.e. Return of a Lifeboat (1897) and A Storm at Sea (1900) the latter of which was shot on a passenger ship with the camera catching some of the glimmer from the sun.

Filmography

1896

 Watermelon Contest
 Interrupted Lover 
 Going to the Fire
 Lone Fisherman
 Edison Drawn by World Artist
 Mess Call 
 Irish Way of Discussing Politics
 Little Egypt
 Herald Square
 Fatima's Coochee-Coochee Dance 
 The Bad Boy and the Gardener
 Sea Beach Scene
 Scene on Surf Ave., Coney Island
 Shooting the Chutes 
 Passaic Falls, New Jersey
 Feeding the Doves
 A Morning Bath
 The Burning Stable 
 Mounted Police Charge
 A Morning Alarm
 Black Diamond Express
 American Falls from Above, American Side

1897

 Serpentine Dance - Annabelle
 The First Sleigh-Ride 
 Chicken Thieves
 Police Patrol Wagon
 Fifth Avenue, New York
 Seminary Girls 
 Black Diamond Express, No. 1
 Husking Bee
 Mr. Edison at Work in His Chemical Laboratory
 Giant Coal Dumper 
 Armour's Electric Trolley
 Philadelphia Express, Jersey Central Railway
 Free-for-All Race at Charter Oak Park
 Corner Madison & State Streets, Chicago 
 Buffalo Police on Parade
 Buffalo Stockyards
 Sheep Run, Chicago Stockyards
 Falls of Minnehaha 
 Cattle Driven to Slaughter
 Sutro Baths, No. 2
 Cupid and Psyche
 Arrest in Chinatown, San Francisco, Cal.
 Capsize of Lifeboat
 Leander Sisters 
 S.S. Coptic Sailing Away
 Return of the Lifeboat
 First Avenue, Seattle, Washington, No. 8
 The Sea Lions' Home 
 Boxing for Points
 Sutro Baths, No. 1
 Lurline Baths
 Surf at Monterey 
 Buffalo Fire Dept. in Action
 Fisherman's Wharf
 Stanford University, California
 Hotel Del Monte 
 Launch of Life Boat
 Horses Loading for the Klondike
 Fishing Smacks
 Lick Observatory, Mt. Hamilton, Cal. 
 S.S. Queen Leaving Dock
 Loading Baggage for Klondike
 S.S. Williamette Leaving for Klondike
 S.S. Coptic at Dock
 S.S. Coptic in the Harbor
 Hotel Vendom, San Jose, Cal. 
 Southern Pacific Overland Mall
 Boat Wagon and Beach Cart
 S.S. Queen Loading
 Fast Mail, Northern Pacific Railroad

1898

 Ella Lola, a la Trilby
 Sunday Morning in Mexico 
 Japanese Sampans
 Ostriches Running, No. 1
 Mexican Rurales Charge
 Street Scene, San Diego 
 Chinese Procession
 Eagle Dance, Pueblo Indians
 Wash Day in Mexico
 Going Through the Tunnel 
 Indian Day School
 South Spring Street, Los Angeles, Cal.
 Sunset Limited, Southern Pacific Ry.
 Calf Branding 
 Cattle Leaving the Corral
 California Limited, A.T. & S.F.R.R.
 Lassoing a Steer
 Mount Tamalpais R.R., No. 1 
 Bull Fight, No. 3
 After Launching
 Parade of Chinese
 Mount Tamalpais R.R., No. 2
 Freight Train
 Launch of Japanese Man-of-War Chitosa 
 Native Daughters
 Union Iron Works
 Procession of Floats
 Launching No. 2 
 S.S. Coptic Running Against the Storm
 Mount Taw R.R., No. 3
 Troops Embarking at San Francisco
 Troop Ships for the Philippines 
 Kanakas Diving for Money (Honolulu), No. 2
 Shooting Captured Insurgents
 Cuban Ambush
 Victorious Squadron Firing Salute 
 Farmer Kissing the Lean Girl
 Statue of Liberty
 Close View of the Brooklyn Naval Parade
 The Fleet Steaming Up North River 
 Observation Train Following Parade
 Reviewing the Texas at Grant's Tomb
 Turkish Dance, Ella Lola
 Fighting the Fire

References

1872 births
1944 deaths
Canadian film directors
Cinema pioneers
Edison Pioneers
Silent film directors